Kil Jae-son (born 5 May 1975) is a North Korean long-distance runner. He competed in the men's marathon at the 2000 Summer Olympics.

References

1975 births
Living people
Athletes (track and field) at the 2000 Summer Olympics
North Korean male long-distance runners
North Korean male marathon runners
Olympic athletes of North Korea
Place of birth missing (living people)